Reserve station is a railway station in Reserve, Saskatchewan, Canada. It serves as a flag stop for Via Rail's Winnipeg–Churchill train.

Footnotes

External links 
Via Rail Station Information

Hudson Bay No. 394, Saskatchewan
Via Rail stations in Saskatchewan